The Cross-Strait high-level talks are a series of meetings between
 the president of the Association for Relations Across the Taiwan Straits (ARATS), People's Republic of China and
 the chairman of the Straits Exchange Foundation (SEF), Republic of China (Taiwan).
The two semi-governmental organizations represent their respective governments to deal with the Cross-Strait relations. The first eight talks were called Chen–Chiang talks or Chiang–Chen talks, named after the surnames of leaders: Chen Yunlin of ARATS and Chiang Pin-kung of SEF.

Meetings

See also
 Cross-Strait relations
 Wang–Koo summit
 2014 Wang–Zhang meetings
 2015 Ma–Xi meeting

References

Cross-Strait relations